Quartz is an American English language news website. It is privately held, and is focused on international business news. Quartz was established in New York City in 2012. It has specific publications for Africa, Hong Kong, India, Japan, and the United Arab Emirates.  They initially did not have a paywall, then did, then dropped it.

Audience and revenue
Quartz targets high-earning readers, calling itself a "digitally native news outlet for business people in the new global economy". About Sixty percent of its readers access the site via mobile devices.

In August 2017, Quartzs website saw about 22 million unique visitors. Approximately 700,000 people subscribe to its roster of email newsletters, which includes its flagship Daily Brief.

According to Ad Age, Quartz made around $30 million in revenue in 2016, and employed 175 people.

In 2017, revenue decreased to $27.6 million as advertising shrank.

History
On September 24, 2012, Quartz launched its website, designed to deliver content primarily to mobile and tablet users. Its founding team members were from news organizations including Bloomberg, The Economist, The New York Times, and The Wall Street Journal. According to its website, Quartz's team reports in 115 countries and speaks 19 languages. The publication was initially led by Kevin Delaney, a former managing director of WSJ.com, Zach Seward, a former WSJ social media editor, and Gideon Lichfield, a global news editor from The Economist, among other editors.

Quartzs main office is located in New York. It also has correspondents and staff reporters based in Hong Kong, India, London, Los Angeles, Thailand, Washington DC, and elsewhere.

In 2014, Quartz expanded into India, launching Quartz India. In 2015, it launched the Africa-focused Quartz Africa.

In 2015, it launched Atlas, a chart-building platform.

In July 2018, Japanese company Uzabase (Japanese: ユーザベース) acquired Quartz from Atlantic Media for $86 million.

In October 2019 co-founder/co-CEO/editor in chief Kevin Delaney stepped down from his position. Zach Seward, the company's second employee, became the company's new chief executive officer.

That same month Apple removed the Quartz app from its Chinese App Store, as part of the Great Firewall, for reporting on the 2019–20 Hong Kong protests.

Revenue fell from $11.6 million in the first half of 2019 to $5 million in the first half of 2020. In November 2020, Uzabase sold Quartz to the publication's staff. In April 2022, the site was sold to G/O Media.

Content

Quartz is structured around a collection of phenomena or what it calls "obsessions" instead of "beats", preferring news stories or reports to be either short or long rather than middle of the road or average.

Quartz often uses charts, created through its Atlas tool. The tool is used by other media organizations, including CNBC, FiveThirtyEight, NBC News, New Hampshire Public Radio, NPR, The New Yorker, The Press-Enterprise, CEOWORLD magazine, and The Wall Street Journal.

See also

 Quartz News (Facebook Watch)

References

Business newspapers published in the United States
Economics websites
American news websites
Internet properties established in 2012
2018 mergers and acquisitions